Giah Dowran (also Romanized as Gīāh Darvān, Gīāh Dowrān, and Gīyāh Dowrān) is a village in Mangur-e Sharqi Rural District, Khalifan District, Mahabad County, West Azerbaijan Province, Iran. At the 2006 census, its population was 225, in 26 families.

References 

Populated places in Mahabad County